Chamaita is a town and village development committee  in Ilam District in the Province No. 1 of eastern Nepal. At the time of the 1991 Nepal census, it had a population of 5,229 people living in 863 individual households.

References

External links
UN map of the municipalities of Ilam District

Populated places in Ilam District